Derek Schiller is an American baseball front office executive. Schiller joined the Atlanta Braves organization in 2003 and he has served as the Braves' president since 2016. Schiller served as vice president of business development for the New York Yankees from 1996 to 1997.

Career
Derek Schiller graduated from Vanderbilt University with a degree in engineering. He joined the Braves in November 2003 as senior vice president of sales and marketing. Terry McGuirk, the Braves president at the time, hired Schiller to address the attendance woes the club was facing despite having a winning team. Schiller was promoted to executive vice president of sales and marketing in August 2007. Before joining the Braves front office he held an executive positions with the New York Yankees and with Atlanta's former NHL franchise, the Atlanta Thrashers. In 2016, John Schuerholz stepped down as president of the Atlanta Braves and Mike Plant took over as president in charge of development and Derek Schiller became the president overseeing the Braves. In 2018, Schiller, who had been the team’s president of business received a new title of president and chief executive officer of the Braves. He inherited responsibility for the day-to-day oversight of all business functions of the team.

In 2022, Schiller was recognized by the Marietta Daily Journal as the Citizen of the Year. As president of business Schiller is responsible for all forms of revenue within the Braves organization.

Personal life
Schiller and his wife, Kristin, live in Atlanta with their two children. He is the son of sports executive Harvey Schiller.

References

Atlanta Braves executives
Living people
Major League Baseball executives
Major League Baseball team presidents
New York Yankees executives
People from Atlanta
Vanderbilt University alumni
Year of birth missing (living people)